Victor Riu (born 6 April 1985) is a French professional golfer.

Career
Riu began playing golf at the age of eleven and turned professional in 2006. He spent three years playing on the Alps Tour, finishing second in the order of merit in 2008 to advance to the Challenge Tour. After a further three years at that level, with two runners-up finishes and a best season of 32nd in the 2010 standings, Riu came through qualifying school at the end of 2011 to earn a place on the European Tour for the first time.

Professional wins (2)

Challenge Tour wins (1)

French Tour wins (1)

See also
2011 European Tour Qualifying School graduates
2013 Challenge Tour graduates

References

External links

French male golfers
European Tour golfers
1985 births
Living people